Aagat is a Nepali novel by Bhawani Bhikshu. It was published in 1975 (2032 BS) by Sajha Prakashan. It won the prestigious Madan Puraskar in the same year. Bhikshu spent 25 years to complete the novel.

Synopsis 
The novel depicts the lifestyle and culture of the Madhesh region of Nepal. The book presents transitional period of Nepali history. The period when land-reform and the uprooting of feudal aristocracy was happening is depicted in the novel. The novel is considered a first Aanchalik (regional) writing of Nepali literature.

Awards 
The book won the Madan Puraskar for 2032 BS (1975) presented by the Madan Puraskar Guthi. It also received the Sajha Puraskar in the same year which is awarded to the best book published within the Sajha Publications.

See also 

 Ghumne Mechmathi Andho Manche
 Ghamka Pailaharu
 Madhabi

References 

20th-century Nepalese books
20th-century Nepalese novels
Nepalese novels
Madan Puraskar-winning works
Sajha Puraskar-winning works
Nepali-language novels
1975 Nepalese novels
Novels set in Nepal